Findochty Castle is a ruined 16th century L-plan tower house, near Findochty, Moray, Scotland, about  north-east of Buckie, and about  from the sea to the north.

The castle stands on a rock at the end of a drained loch.

History

The castle was built by the Gordons, but was acquired by the Ogilvies, and, in 1568, by the Ord family, who subsequently developed Findochty village as a fishing port.

The castle was a ruin in 1794.
Some repairs were done to the castle remains in the 1880s.

Structure

  
The main building has been destroyed, apart from part of the north wall, and of the west wing.

There was a vaulted basement, while the hall was on the first floor.

The castle is constructed of harl-pointed rubble, with roughly tooled dressings.  There is a narrow door in the south front, with a relieving arch.

The castle is a scheduled monument.

References

Castles in Moray
Listed castles in Scotland
Scheduled Ancient Monuments in Moray